The Swedish Empire had the greatest and most numerous copper mines in Europe as it entered into its pre-eminence in the early 17th century as an emerging Great Power. Through poor fiscal policies and in part the First Treaty of Älvsborg, Sweden lost control of its reserves of precious metals, primarily silver, of which most had fled to the burgeoning trade economy of Amsterdam. In 1607 the Swedish King Charles IX attempted to persuade the populace to exchange their silver-based currency for a copper-based coin of equal face value, though this offer was not generally taken up. Sweden's large army of the time were paid entirely in copper currency, further issued in large numbers by Gustavus II to finance his war against Ferdinand II of Germany. The face value of the copper coins in circulation now greatly exceeded the reserves of the state and production of the national economy, and quickly the value of the currency fell to its commodity value, which in a country where copper was so abundant, was small indeed. The savings of the people of Sweden were wiped out.

When Gustavus' daughter and heir Christina reached maturity at 18, after a brief fling with paper-based money backed by copper—which was well received initially but soon lost credibility—she began issuing copper in lumps as large as fifteen kilograms to serve as currency. Unwieldy as they were, the copper-based monetary system worked to a fashion until the world copper price slumped. Sweden's great copper no longer commanded the premium it once had on world markets, and foreign income dried up. Relative to the rest of Europe, Sweden's people once more had become poor.

In an effort to shore up the economy, government minister Baron von Görtz stepped up to the challenge and became the country's central banker. He issued more copper-based currency without limit, with a face value of one daler (much greater than their intrinsic value) and which were technically inferior and easy to counterfeit. Soon these coins were so abundant that they too depreciated rapidly towards their raw metal value as belief spread that the copper coins would soon be unacceptable as a form of payment of taxes. Görtz was blamed for the failure, and was duly beheaded in March 1719, a punishment which greatly pleased the Swedish people. At the end of July 1768 plate money was abolished but reintroduced on 4 August.

See also

 Economy of Sweden
 History of Sweden

References

External links 
 Monetary Episodes From History
 A Nordic heavy weight
 Money in Sweden – from Gustav Vasa until Today
 The multiple currencies of Sweden-Finland 1534–1803 by Rodney Edvinsson. Chapter 4.3. The period 1624–1719
STOCKHOLMS BANCO
 SHIELLS, ROBERT. "SWEDISH COPPER PLATE-MONEY." American Journal of Numismatics (1897–1924) 32, no. 2 (1897): 49–51. www.jstor.org/stable/43582838.

Copper coins
Coins of Sweden